General Holden may refer to:

Capel Lofft Holden (1856–1937), British Army brigadier general
John Holden (British Army officer) (1913–1995), British Army major general
Michael Holden (character), fictional U.S. Army lieutenant general from the Lifetime TV series Army Wives
Thomas Holden (general) (1741–1823), Rhode Island Militia major general